Ury or URY may refer to:

Places
 River Ury, in Aberdeenshire, Scotland
 Ury House, Stonehaven, Kincardineshire, Scotland, an historic mansion
 Ury, Seine-et-Marne, a commune in the Seine-et-Marne département of France
 Ury, West Virginia, United States, an unincorporated community

Acronym
 University Radio York, a student radio station at the University of York, England

People
 David Ury (born 1973), American actor and comedian
 Else Ury (1877–1943), German writer and children's book author
 John Ury (died 1741), white itinerant teacher suspected of being a Catholic priest and a Spanish spy during the 1741 New York Slave Insurrection
 Lesser Ury (1861–1931), German Impressionist painter and printmaker
 Lon Ury (1877–1918), Major League Baseball first baseman during the end of the 1903 season
 William Ury, American author, anthropologist, and negotiation expert
 Ury Benador, pen name of Romanian playwright and prose writer Simon Moise Grinberg (1895–1971)

Codes and marks
 Uruguay ISO 3166-1 Alpha-3 country code (URY)
 Gurayat Domestic Airport IATA code (URY)
 Orya language ISO 639-3 code (ury)
 Union Railway of Memphis shipping mark (URY) - see List of reporting marks: U

See also
Urey (disambiguation)
Uri (disambiguation)
Urie (disambiguation)